The following is a comprehensive list of all drum corps that have appeared in Drum Corps International World Championship Finals. Active World Class corps are in boldface, while a blue shaded background indicates the current top twelve finalist corps as of 2022. There was no 2020 DCI season due to the COVID-19 pandemic. There were no scored competitions in the 2021 DCI season.

Notes and references

See also
 Drum Corps International

Drum Corps International World Championship finalists